Trams in Nizhyn (translit.: Nizhynskyi Tramvai) were the part of the public transportation system that served Nizhyn, a town of the Chernihiv Oblast, starting in 1915. Horse trams in Nizhyn first opened in 1915. 

The tram system became defunct in the mid-1920s, and never recovered. Information on the number of lines that existed is not available.

External links
 

Nizhyn
Tram transport in Ukraine
1915 establishments in the Russian Empire
1915 establishments in Ukraine
Nizhyn